Lu Gong may refer to:

 Lu Gong (Zhongkang) (魯恭), style name Zhongkang (仲康), Eastern Han Dynasty official
 Lü Gong (呂公), a subordinate of the Eastern Han Dynasty warlord Liu Biao